Electrically Possessed is a compilation album by the English-French band Stereolab, released on 26 February 2021 under Duophonic Records and Warp Records. It collects the band's rarities, and is the fourth of their "Switched-On" compilation series. The track "Dimension M2" was released following the compilation's announcement, followed by "Household Names", taken from the mini album The First of the Microbe Hunters.

Summary
The compilation begins with the EP, The First of the Microbe Hunters, described as having a "busy" and "jazz-based sound". This is followed by the next track "Solar Throw-Away [Original Verson]", which was unreleased. A different version of the track appeared in a 7" tour single, released on 10 April 2006, also containing "Jump Drive Shut-Out". The track "Pandora's Box of Worms" is an unreleased out-take from the Dots and Loops (1997) recording sessions. "Explosante Fixe" and "L'exostime Intérieur" were part of a 7" tour single released in September 2008. The Underground is Coming was released as a 7", 33rpm tour single in 1999, containing the tracks "The Super-it", "Fried Monkey Eggs [Instrumental]", "Fried Monkey Eggs [Vocal]" and "Monkey Jelly". "Monkey Jelly [Beats]" was unreleased.

"B.U.A" was written in collaboration with artist Charles Long for his 1998 artwork titled "B.U.A [Burnt Under Assembly] An Entanglement of Wholes" and was previously unreleased. "Free Witch and No Bra Queen" and "Speck Voice" were part of a 7" inch tour single released on 31 August 2001. "Heavy Denim Loop pt 2" is an unreleased out-take from the Mars Audiac Quintet (1994) recording sessions. "Variation One" was part of a soundtrack and compilation CD for the 2004 documentary Moog. "Dimension M2" was part a compilation CD title Disko Cabine, released in June 2005. "Calimero" was written in collaboration with Brigitte Fontaine, released in July 1999 as a 7" single under Duophonic Super 45s.

Reception

Electrically Possessed was met with universal acclaim from music critics. At Metacritic, which assigns a weighted average rating out of 100 to reviews from mainstream publications, the album received an average score of 83, based on 6 reviews. While critics considered it a weaker volume in the "Switched-On" series, critics have seen Electrically Possessed as an example of the band releasing consistent material. Robert Ham of Pitchfork called the compilation "a bounty of highlights from a rich period when Tim Gane was writing pop songs with multi-layered, almost-proggy arrangements to better support frontwoman Lætitia Sadier’s dense sociopolitical lyrics." Regarding the compilation "cover[ring] nearly half of [Stereolab]'s career ", Heather Phares wrote that "by contrast, the original Switched On gathered just six months' worth of music -- but like the other volumes in the series, it captures the flavor of its era just as completely as Stereolab's full-lengths." Other reviewers of the compilation gave retrospective reappraisals to the band's post-Dots and Loops material in this period, which initially received lukewarm to negative reviews.

Ham said that after the first seven tracks of the EP The First of the Microbe Hunters, the compilation "naturally doesn’t move along the same deliberate course as a proper album... The material compiled here isn’t sequenced chronologically, so the mood and sound jumps from track to track and there are a small number of nonessential inclusions, like ['Pandora's Box of Worms']". Daniel Sylvester of Exclaim! wrote that while Electrically Possessed "offers no real throwaways", he said that the EP The First of the Microbe Hunters, "hasn't exactly improved with age aside from the rubbery, melodic standout 'Household Names'", and felt that tracks such as "Explosante Fixe" and "Monkey Jelly" were "uninspired".

Track listing

Charts

References 

2021 compilation albums
Stereolab compilation albums